Fatima bint Asad (555–626 CE), was the mother of Ali ibn Abi Talib, married to Abu Talib, and an aunt to Muhammad.

Fatima bint Asad and her husband, Abu Talib, acted as prophet's adopted parents for fifteen years, since Muhammad had lost his mother, when he was six (his father had died before he was born). Years later Muhammad got the chance to pay back the love he got from Fatima bint Asad, by adopting Ali, Fatima's youngest child, as his son.

Giving birth to Ali is recorded as a miraculous event, by Shia and Sunni, in the life of Fatima bint Asad. Since, as it is said, Kaaba's wall split open in order for Fatima to get in the house and give birth to her son, Ali.
After Muhammad's wife, Khadija bint Khuwaylid, Fatima bint Asad was the second woman who entered the fold of Islam. Ali ibn Abi Talib was given the name of Haydar, meaning lion, by his mother Fatima bint Asad.

Ancestry
Fatima bint Asad was the wife of Abu Talib, who was Muhammad's uncle. 
She was the daughter of Asad ibn Hashim and Fatima bint Qays, hence a member of the Hashim clan of the Quraysh.

The maternal grandfather of Muhammad's wife Khadija bint Khuwaylid, Za'ida ibn al-Asamm ibn Rawaha, was the cousin of Fatima's mother.

Biography

Raising Muhammad
Muhammad's father, Abdullah died before he was born. Then at the age of six, was orphaned from his mother too. After that, his grandfather, Abd al-Muttalib, took after him for a couple of years before he, himself died when Muhammad was eight. Then at the year 578, Muhammad was adopted by Fatima bint Asad and Abu Talib as their son. It is said that Fatima loved Muhammad more than her own children.
In his later years, Muhammad, used to say of her that she would have let her own children go hungry rather than him.

Years later, Muhammad got the opportunity to pay back the love he received from the family, as he and his wife, Khadija, adopted Ali as their son, to help Abu Talib, go through the famine affected Mecca. Moreover, it is said that Muhammad named his own daughter Fatima after Fatima bint Asad, although Khadija's mother was also called Fatima.

Giving birth to Ali
Fatima bint Asad already had three sons -Talib, Aqil and Ja'far – and 2 daughters , Jumanah and  Fakhitah (also known as Umm Hani)-,prior to giving birth to Ali. She is estimated to be in her late thirties at the time, while Muhammad, her adopted son was about 23. So Ali was her youngest child, who was born in the year 599.
Her giving birth to Ali has a miraculous story. When she got the pain of labor, he reached to Kaaba, praying "Oh God, for the sake of the one who built this house, Abraham, and the child inside me, I beseech you to make this delivery easy."
Then, the wall of Kaaba slivered open from a corner and Fatima got inside, and delivered her child, Ali, in the house. After three days, according to both Shia and Sunni narrations she walked out of Kaaba, with the  child in her arms. Fatima named the child, Haydar, which means Lion in Arabic, while his cousin, Muhammad, called him Ali.

Second woman to embrace Islam
After Muhammad became prophet, Fatima bint Asad was the second woman, after Khadija, who entered the fold of Islam.
Thus she is described as a "righteous woman". Following Abu Talib's death in 620, Fatima emigrated to Medina with Fatima bint Muhammad and her son Ali in 622. Muhammad would regularly visit her home and would have his afternoon rest there.

Death
Fatima bint Asad died in the year 625/626. It is narrated by Anas bin Malik, that when Muhammad learned that Fatima had died, he went to her house to sit beside her body and prayed her funeral prayers, he then gave his shirt to be incorporated into her shroud, and personally helped inspecting her grave and placing her in it in the Jannat al-Baqi cemetery in Medina.

Family
She married her paternal cousin, Abu Talib ibn Abd al-Muttalib. Their marriage was notable for being the first between two members of the Banu Hashim. They had seven children:
Talib.
Fakhitah (aka "Hind" & "Umm Hani").
Aqil.
Jumanah.
Ja'far.
Rayta (aka "Asmā'" & "Umm Ṭālib").
Ali, who was the husband of Muhammad's daughter Fatima.
The orphaned Muhammad, who was Abu Talib's nephew and Fatima's cousin, came to live in their house in 579 (when he was eight years old).

Ancestry Chart

See also 

 Abu Talib ibn Abd al-Muttalib
 Zubayr ibn Abd al-Muttalib
 Abd Allah ibn Abd al-Muttalib
 Barrah bint Abd al-Muttalib
 Arwā bint Abd al-Muttalib
 'Ātikah bint Abd al-Muttalib
 Umm Ḥakīm (al-Baiḍā) bint Abd al-Muttalib
 Umayma bint Abd al-Muttalib

Notes

Footnotes

References
 

Mahmood Ahmad Ghadanfar. Great Women of Islam. Translated by Jamila Muhammad Qawi. Darussalam Publishers & Distributors, Riyadh. Online at kalamullah.com. pp. 163–167. Retrieved 2013-06-22.

External links
 Fatima bint Asad & Kaaba 
 Yazehra

Women companions of the Prophet
550s births
620s deaths
6th-century Arabs
7th-century Arabs
Burials at Jannat al-Baqī